(Japan > Mie Prefecture > Iinan District)

 was a district located in Mie Prefecture, Japan.

As of 2003, the district had an estimated population of 11,235 and the total area was 317.27 km2.

Timeline 
 March 29, 1896 - The district was formed when Iitaka and Iino Districts merged. (1 town, 23 villages)
 April 1, 1908 - The village of Kamiyama(?) broke off and merged into the villages of Izawa and Kushida (respectively). (1 town, 22 villages)
 January 1, 1921 - The village of Susudomari(?) was merged into the town of Matsusaka. (1 town, 21 villages)
 January 1, 1924 - The village of Kakino was elevated to town status to become the town of Kakino. (2 towns, 20 villages)
 April 1, 1931 - The village of Kobe(?) was merged into the town of Matsusaka. (2 towns, 19 villages)
 July 1, 1932 - The village of Hanaoka was elevated to town status to become the town of Hanaoka. (3 towns, 18 villages)
 1933:
 February 1 - The town of Matsusaka was elevated to city status to become the city of Matsusaka. (2 towns, 18 villages)
 February 11 - The village of Kayumi was elevated to town status to become the town of Kayumi. (3 towns, 17 villages)
 December 25, 1948 - The villages of Matsue and Asami were merged into the city of Matsusaka. (3 towns, 15 villages)
 December 1, 1951 - The village of Isedera was merged into the city of Matsusaka. (3 towns, 14 villages)
 December 1, 1952 - The village of Hatadono merged into the city of Matsusaka. (3 towns, 13 villages)
 October 15, 1954 - The town of Hanaoka, and the villages of Minato, Matsuo and Nishikurobe were merged into the city of Matsusaka. (2 towns, 10 villages)
 April 1, 1955 - The villages of Chihiroe, Oishi, Izawa and Ishiro were merged into the city of Matsusaka. (2 towns, 6 villages)
 August 1, 1956: (2 towns, 2 villages)
 The towns of Kakino and Kayumi were merged to become the town of Iinan.
 The villages of Miyamae, Kabata, Mori and Haze were merged to become the town of Iitaka.
 October 1, 1957 - The villages of Okawachi and Kushida were merged into the city of Matsusaka. (2 towns)
 On January 1, 2005 - The towns of Iinan and Iitaka, along with the towns of Mikumo and Ureshino (both from Ichishi District), were merged into the expanded city of Matsusaka. Iinan District was dissolved as a result of this merger.

See also 
 List of dissolved districts of Japan

Former districts of Mie Prefecture